The Zimbabwe cricket team toured the United Arab Emirates to play the Afghanistan cricket team in February 2018 to play two Twenty20 Internationals (T20Is) and five One Day International (ODI) matches. Initial reports suggested that it would include Afghanistan's first Test match since being awarded Test status by the International Cricket Council in June 2017, but instead the tour consisted of just limited overs matches. An official from Zimbabwe Cricket said that both sides were still in talks to play a Test match, but that would be at some point after the 2018 Cricket World Cup Qualifier.

Afghanistan won the T20I series 2–0, moving up to eighth place in the ICC T20I Championship, above Sri Lanka. Afghanistan won the ODI series 4–1.

Squads

T20I series

1st T20I

2nd T20I

ODI series

1st ODI

2nd ODI

3rd ODI

4th ODI

5th ODI

References

External links
 Series home at ESPN Cricinfo

2018 in Afghan cricket
2018 in Zimbabwean cricket
International cricket competitions in 2017–18
Afghan cricket tours of the United Arab Emirates
Zimbabwean cricket tours of the United Arab Emirates